Salins may refer to :

Places
 Salins, Cantal, commune in the Cantal department, France
 Salins, Seine-et-Marne, commune in the Seine-et-Marne department, France
 Salins, Switzerland, former municipality in the canton of Valais, Switzerland
 Salins-les-Bains, commune in the Jura department, France
 Salins-les-Thermes, former commune in the Savoie department, France
 Château-Salins, commune in the Moselle department, France

People
Salins (surname)

See also
Salin (disambiguation)
Sallins, Ireland